Al Vandenberg (1932–2012) was an American photographer notable for his street portraiture and collaboration on the album cover of Sgt Pepper's Lonely Hearts Club Band by The Beatles.

Early life

Vandenberg was born to Dutch parents in Boston, USA in 1932. Joining the US military and serving in the Korean War, Vandenberg later attended art school in Boston then studied photography in New York City with Alexey Brodovitch, Richard Avedon and Bruce Davidson. Taking images of poverty, urban deprivation and ethnic minorities on the streets of New York – themes already explored by Diane Arbus and Garry Winogrand – Vandenberg's photographs were subsequently exhibited at the Smithsonian Institution for President Lyndon B. Johnson's War on Poverty.

Photographic career
Vandenberg worked as an art director for ad agency Doyle, Dane and Bernbach in New York. He was already a keen photographer before moving to London and had a photograph in the Museum of Modern Art. He moved to London in 1964 to pursue a career in photography- editorial, fashion, advertising and music. Vandenberg collaborated on the album cover of Sgt Pepper's Lonely Hearts Club Band. Disillusioned with his commercial practice, Vandenberg eventually abandoned his business work altogether to concentrate on his personal street portraits.

From the 1970s onwards, Vandenberg's own photographs—as opposed to his commercial work—were made on the streets, although the emphasis of the pictures had now changed.
Where earlier he had studied depression and poverty, producing images of alienation, he now photographed people looking directly into the camera and enjoying themselves; people who attracted him and with whom he could establish a rapport. His subjects were now relaxed and responsive, sharing with him in the making of the picture. His series of high street photographs embraced the people of Singapore, Tokyo, Hollywood, New York, Hong Kong, Beijing, Laos and London, and totalled thousands of images.

In 1980 Vandenberg co-founded the "Hereford Photography Festival". This was the longest running annual photography competition in the UK until its closure in 2012.

In 2016 Stanley Barker published Vandenberg’s first monograph ‘On a Good Day: Al Vandenberg’. "Vandenberg sees all this with a sincere and perceptive eye and a sensitive understanding of character, regardless of social standing and cultural background…" explains Senior Curator of the V&A, Martin Barnes, in his afterword.

Death

Vandenberg died in Hereford, UK in 2012 having completed his third trip to China where he was preparing a body of work on its young people entitled "The Good People of China". Shortly after Vandenberg's death in 2012 his work was exhibited at Tate Britain and the V&A Museum London.

Vandenberg is survived by three children, Michael, Thomas and Tess.

Permanent collections
 The Smithsonian Institution, Washington DC
 The Stedelijk Museum, Amsterdam
 Musee de L'Elysee, Lausanne
 The Kobal Collection
 The Wagstaff Collection
 Museum of Modern Art, New York
 Victoria & Albert Museum, London
 British Council
 Tate Britain, London

Selected exhibitions 
 2012: Tate, London
 2012: Victoria & Albert Museum, London
 1985: Sala Arcs De Caixa De Barcelona, Spain
 1985: Circulo De Bellas Artes, Madrid, Spain
 1981: Zagreb, Galerije Grada, Yugoslavia
 1980: British Council, Rotterdam, Netherlands

References

General references
 V&A · Staying Power: Photographs of Black British Experience
 https://web.archive.org/web/20141206151833/http://collection.britishcouncil.org/collection/artists/al-vandenberg-1932
 Another London: exhibition room guide, room 7
 Another London: photos of London from 1930–1980
 The Beatles Bible – Cover shoot for Sgt Pepper
 My generation: British childhood from the age of austerity to the age of excess | London Evening Standard
 Subscribe to read  Financial Times
 https://www.standard.co.uk/goingout/exhibitions/london-through-a-lens-7952559.html
 Photo festival reaches 20 years
 Hereford Photography Festival | The Arts Desk

External links

1932 births
2012 deaths
Photography in China
Street photographers
Artists from Boston
American photographers
American expatriates in the United Kingdom